Chantelle Dawn Eberle (born September 17, 1981 in Regina, Saskatchewan as Chantelle Seiferling) is a Canadian curler.

Background
Eberle was one of the top junior curlers in Saskatchewan during her junior career. In 2001, she won her lone provincial junior title, playing second for Stefanie Lawton (Miller). The team, which also included Stefanie's sister Marliese at third, and Chelsey Matson (Bell) at lead went undefeated at the 2001 Canadian Junior Curling Championships after the round robin. However, the team went up against another strong team in Prince Edward Island's Suzanne Birt (Gaudet). P.E.I beat the Saskatchewan four-some 5-3.

Since her junior career, Eberle has been one of the top skips in Saskatchewan. She played in her first women's provincial in 2003, when her rink placed 4th in the province. Since then she has also played in the 2004, 2005, 2006, 2009, 2010, 2011 and 2012 provincial championships. Her best finish was 3rd at the 2006 Saskatchewan Scott Tournament of Hearts.

Wins
In 2011, Eberle won the 2012 Canadian Mixed Curling Championship for Saskatchewan, playing third for Jason Ackerman. Eberle and Dean Hicke, the second on that team traveled to Erzurum, Turkey to play at the 2012 World Mixed Doubles Curling Championship to represent Canada. The pair won their group by posting an undefeated 8-0 record, but they lost in the quarter final to Sweden, eliminating them from the event.

Grand Slam record

Former events

References
 Results of the 2001 Canadian Junior Curling Championships

External links
 

1981 births
Living people
Curlers from Regina, Saskatchewan
Canadian women curlers
Canadian mixed curling champions